A therapy or medical treatment (often abbreviated tx, Tx, or Tx) is the attempted remediation of a health problem, usually following a medical diagnosis.

As a rule, each therapy has indications and contraindications.  There are many different types of therapy.  Not all therapies are effective.  Many therapies can produce unwanted adverse effects.

Medical treatment and therapy are generally considered synonyms.  However,  in the context of mental health, the term therapy may refer specifically to psychotherapy.

History 

Before the creating of therapy as a formal procedure, people told stories to one another to inform and assist about the world. The term "healing through words" was used over 3,500 years ago in Greek and Egyptian writing. The term psychotherapy was invented in the 19th century, and psychoanalysis was founded by Sigmund Freud under a decade later.

Semantic field 
The words care, therapy, treatment, and intervention overlap in a semantic field, and thus they can be synonymous depending on context. Moving rightward through that order, the connotative level of holism decreases and the level of specificity (to concrete instances) increases. Thus, in health care contexts (where its senses are always noncount), the word care tends to imply a broad idea of everything done to protect or improve someone's health (for example, as in the terms preventive care and primary care, which connote ongoing action), although it sometimes implies a narrower idea (for example, in the simplest cases of wound care or postanesthesia care, a few particular steps are sufficient, and the patient's interaction with that provider is soon finished). In contrast, the word intervention tends to be specific and concrete, and thus the word is often countable; for example, one instance of cardiac catheterization is one intervention performed, and coronary care (noncount) can require a series of interventions (count). At the extreme, the piling on of such countable interventions amounts to interventionism, a flawed model of care lacking holistic circumspection—merely treating discrete problems (in billable increments) rather than maintaining health. Therapy and treatment, in the middle of the semantic field, can connote either the holism of care or the discreteness of intervention, with context conveying the intent in each use. Accordingly, they can be used in both noncount and count senses (for example, therapy for chronic kidney disease can involve several dialysis treatments per week).

The words aceology and iamatology are obscure and obsolete synonyms referring to the study of therapies.

Types of therapies 
Therapy comes in different forms. These include, cognitive behavioral therapy, dialectical behavior therapy, mindful based cognitive therapy, physical therapy, etc. Therapists are here for use and used daily by many people. Therapist are trained to provide treatment to an individual or group. Therapy was invented in the 1800s and the founder was Franz Mesmer, the "Father of Western Psychotherapy". Sigmund Freud then comes into play and shows us the understanding depth of all the different types included in therapy. Therapy is used in many ways to shape and help reform a person. This type of treatment allows individuals to regain gain goals lost or wanting to accomplish. Many individuals come into therapy looking for ways to cope with issues and to receive an emotional release. For example, healing from trauma, in need of support, emotional issues, and many more. Allowing yourself to express your thoughts and feelings go a long way in therapy recovery, this is called the therapeutic process.

By chronology, priority, or intensity

Levels of care 
Levels of care classify health care into categories of chronology, priority, or intensity, as follows:
 Emergency care handles medical emergencies and is a first point of contact or intake for less serious problems, which can be referred to other levels of care as appropriate.
 Intensive care, also called critical care, is care for extremely ill or injured patients. It thus requires high resource intensity, knowledge, and skill, as well as quick decision making.
 Ambulatory care is care provided on an outpatient basis. Typically patients can walk into and out of the clinic under their own power (hence "ambulatory"), usually on the same day.
 Home care is care at home, including care from providers (such as physicians, nurses, and home health aides) making house calls, care from caregivers such as family members, and patient self-care.
 Primary care is meant to be the main kind of care in general, and ideally a medical home that unifies care across referred providers.
 Secondary care is care provided by medical specialists and other health professionals who generally do not have first contact with patients, for example, cardiologists, urologists and dermatologists. A patient reaches secondary care as a next step from primary care, typically by provider referral although sometimes by patient self-initiative.
 Tertiary care is specialized consultative care, usually for inpatients and on referral from a primary or secondary health professional, in a facility that has personnel and facilities for advanced medical investigation and treatment, such as a tertiary referral hospital.
 Follow-up care is additional care during or after convalescence. Aftercare is generally synonymous with follow-up care.
 End-of-life care is care near the end of one's life. It often includes the following:
 Palliative care is supportive care, most especially (but not necessarily) near the end of life.
 Hospice care is palliative care very near the end of life when cure is very unlikely. Its main goal is comfort, both physical and mental.

Lines of therapy 

Treatment decisions often follow formal or informal algorithmic guidelines. Treatment options can often be ranked or prioritized into lines of therapy: first-line therapy, second-line therapy, third-line therapy, and so on. First-line therapy (sometimes referred to as induction therapy, primary therapy, or front-line therapy) is the first therapy that will be tried. Its priority over other options is usually either: (1) formally recommended on the basis of clinical trial evidence for its best-available combination of efficacy, safety, and tolerability or (2) chosen based on the clinical experience of the physician. If a first-line therapy either fails to resolve the issue or produces intolerable side effects, additional (second-line) therapies may be substituted or added to the treatment regimen, followed by third-line therapies, and so on.

An example of a context in which the formalization of treatment algorithms and the ranking of lines of therapy is very extensive is chemotherapy regimens. Because of the great difficulty in successfully treating some forms of cancer, one line after another may be tried. In oncology the count of therapy lines may reach 10 or even 20.

Often multiple therapies may be tried simultaneously (combination therapy or polytherapy). Thus combination chemotherapy is also called polychemotherapy, whereas chemotherapy with one agent at a time is called single-agent therapy or monotherapy.

Adjuvant therapy is therapy given in addition to the primary, main, or initial treatment, but simultaneously (as opposed to second-line therapy). Neoadjuvant therapy is therapy that is begun before the main therapy. Thus one can consider surgical excision of a tumor as the first-line therapy for a certain type and stage of cancer even though radiotherapy is used before it; the radiotherapy is neoadjuvant (chronologically first but not primary in the sense of the main event). Premedication is conceptually not far from this, but the words are not interchangeable; cytotoxic drugs to put a tumor "on the ropes" before surgery delivers the "knockout punch"  are called neoadjuvant chemotherapy, not premedication, whereas things like anesthetics or prophylactic antibiotics before dental surgery are called premedication.

Step therapy or stepladder therapy is a specific type of prioritization by lines of therapy. It is controversial in American health care because unlike conventional decision-making about what constitutes first-line, second-line, and third-line therapy, which in the U.S. reflects safety and efficacy first and cost only according to the patient's wishes, step therapy attempts to mix cost containment by someone other than the patient (third-party payers) into the algorithm. Therapy freedom and the negotiation between individual and group rights are involved.

By intent

By therapy composition 

Treatments can be classified according to the method of treatment:

By matter 
 by drugs: pharmacotherapy, chemotherapy (also, medical therapy often means specifically pharmacotherapy)
 by medical devices: implantation
 cardiac resynchronization therapy
 by specific molecules: molecular therapy (although most drugs are specific molecules, molecular medicine refers in particular to medicine relying on molecular biology)
 by specific biomolecular targets: targeted therapy
 molecular chaperone therapy
 by chelation: chelation therapy
 by specific chemical elements:
 by metals:
 by heavy metals:
 by gold: chrysotherapy (aurotherapy)
 by platinum-containing drugs: platin therapy
 by biometals
 by lithium: lithium therapy
 by potassium: potassium supplementation
 by magnesium: magnesium supplementation
 by chromium: chromium supplementation; phonemic neurological hypochromium therapy
 by copper: copper supplementation
 by nonmetals:
 by diatomic oxygen: oxygen therapy, hyperbaric oxygen therapy (hyperbaric medicine)
 transdermal continuous oxygen therapy
 by triatomic oxygen (ozone): ozone therapy
 by fluoride: fluoride therapy
 by other gases: medical gas therapy
 by water:
 hydrotherapy
 aquatic therapy
 rehydration therapy
 oral rehydration therapy
 water cure (therapy)
 by biological materials (biogenic substances, biomolecules, biotic materials, natural products), including their synthetic equivalents: biotherapy
 by whole organisms
 by viruses: virotherapy
 by bacteriophages: phage therapy
 by animal interaction: see animal interaction section
 by constituents or products of organisms
 by plant parts or extracts (but many drugs are derived from plants, even when the term phytotherapy is not used)
 scientific type: phytotherapy
 traditional (prescientific) type: herbalism
 by animal parts: quackery involving shark fins, tiger parts, and so on, often driving threat or endangerment of species
 by genes: gene therapy
 gene therapy for epilepsy
 gene therapy for osteoarthritis
 gene therapy for color blindness
 gene therapy of the human retina
 gene therapy in Parkinson's disease
 by epigenetics: epigenetic therapy
 by proteins: protein therapy (but many drugs are proteins despite not being called protein therapy)
 by enzymes: enzyme replacement therapy
 by hormones: hormone therapy
 hormonal therapy (oncology)
 hormone replacement therapy
 estrogen replacement therapy
 androgen replacement therapy
 hormone replacement therapy (menopause)
 transgender hormone therapy
 feminizing hormone therapy
 masculinizing hormone therapy
 antihormone therapy
 androgen deprivation therapy
 by whole cells: cell therapy (cytotherapy)
 by stem cells: stem cell therapy
 by immune cells: see immune system products below
 by immune system products: immunotherapy, host modulatory therapy
 by immune cells:
 T-cell vaccination
 cell transfer therapy
 autologous immune enhancement therapy
 TK cell therapy
 by humoral immune factors: antibody therapy
 by whole serum: serotherapy, including antiserum therapy
 by immunoglobulins: immunoglobulin therapy
 by monoclonal antibodies: monoclonal antibody therapy
 by urine: urine therapy (some scientific forms; many prescientific or pseudoscientific forms)
 by food and dietary choices:
 medical nutrition therapy
 grape therapy (quackery)
 by salts (but many drugs are the salts of organic acids, even when drug therapy is not called by names reflecting that)
 by salts in the air
 by natural dry salt air: "taking the cure" in desert locales (especially common in prescientific medicine; for example, one 19th-century way to treat tuberculosis)
 by artificial dry salt air:
 low-humidity forms of speleotherapy
 negative air ionization therapy
 by moist salt air:
 by natural moist salt air: seaside cure (especially common in prescientific medicine)
 by artificial moist salt air: water vapor forms of speleotherapy
 by salts in the water
 by mineral water: spa cure ("taking the waters") (especially common in prescientific medicine)
 by seawater: seaside cure (especially common in prescientific medicine)
 by aroma: aromatherapy
 by other materials with mechanism of action unknown
 by occlusion with duct tape: duct tape occlusion therapy

By energy 
 by electric energy as electric current: electrotherapy, electroconvulsive therapy
 Transcranial magnetic stimulation
 Vagus nerve stimulation
 by magnetic energy:
 magnet therapy
 pulsed electromagnetic field therapy
 magnetic resonance therapy
 by electromagnetic radiation (EMR):
 by light: light therapy (phototherapy)
 ultraviolet light therapy
 PUVA therapy
 photodynamic therapy
 photothermal therapy
 cytoluminescent therapy
 blood irradiation therapy
 by darkness: dark therapy
 by lasers: laser therapy
 low level laser therapy
 by gamma rays: radiosurgery
 Gamma Knife radiosurgery
 stereotactic radiation therapy
 cobalt therapy
 by radiation generally: radiation therapy (radiotherapy)
 intraoperative radiation therapy
 by EMR particles:
 particle therapy
 proton therapy
 electron therapy
 intraoperative electron radiation therapy
 Auger therapy
 neutron therapy
 fast neutron therapy
 neutron capture therapy of cancer
 by radioisotopes emitting EMR:
 by nuclear medicine
 by brachytherapy
 quackery type: electromagnetic therapy (alternative medicine)
 by mechanical: manual therapy as massotherapy and therapy by exercise as in physical therapy
 inversion therapy
 by sound:
 by ultrasound:
 ultrasonic lithotripsy
 extracorporeal shockwave therapy
 sonodynamic therapy
 by music: music therapy
 by temperature
 by heat: heat therapy (thermotherapy)
 by moderately elevated ambient temperatures: hyperthermia therapy
 by dry warm surroundings: Waon therapy
 by dry or humid warm surroundings: sauna, including infrared sauna, for sweat therapy
 by cold:
 by extreme cold to specific tissue volumes: cryotherapy
 by ice and compression: cold compression therapy
 by ambient cold: hypothermia therapy for neonatal encephalopathy
 by hot and cold alternation: contrast bath therapy

By procedure and human interaction 
 Surgery
 by counseling, such as psychotherapy (see also: list of psychotherapies)
 systemic therapy
 by group psychotherapy
 by cognitive behavioral therapy
 by cognitive therapy
 by behaviour therapy
 by dialectical behavior therapy
 by cognitive emotional behavioral therapy
 by cognitive rehabilitation therapy
 by family therapy
 by education
 by psychoeducation
 by information therapy
 by speech therapy, physical therapy, occupational therapy, vision therapy, massage therapy, chiropractic or acupuncture
 by lifestyle modifications, such as avoiding unhealthy food or maintaining a predictable sleep schedule
 by coaching

By animal interaction 
 by pets, assistance animals, or working animals: animal-assisted therapy
 by horses: equine therapy, hippotherapy
 by dogs: pet therapy with therapy dogs, including grief therapy dogs
 by cats: pet therapy with therapy cats
 by fish: ichthyotherapy (wading with fish), aquarium therapy (watching fish)
 by maggots: maggot therapy
 by worms:
 by internal worms: helminthic therapy
 by leeches: leech therapy
 by immersion: animal bath

By meditation 
 by mindfulness: mindfulness-based cognitive therapy

By reading 
 by bibliotherapy

By creativity 
 by expression: expressive therapy
 by writing: writing therapy
 journal therapy
 by play: play therapy
 by art: art therapy
 sensory art therapy
 comic book therapy
 by gardening: horticultural therapy
 by dance: dance therapy
 by drama: drama therapy
 by recreation: recreational therapy
 by music: music therapy

By sleeping and waking 
 by deep sleep: deep sleep therapy
 by sleep deprivation: wake therapy

See also 
 Biophilia hypothesis
 Classification of Pharmaco-Therapeutic Referrals
 Cure
 Interventionism (medicine)
 Inverse benefit law
 List of therapies
 Greyhound therapy
 Mature minor doctrine
 Medicine
 Medication
 Nutraceutical
 Prevention
 Psychotherapy
 Treatment as prevention
 Therapeutic inertia
 Therapeutic nihilism, the idea that treatment is useless

References

External links
 
 
 "Chapter Nine of the Book of Medicine Dedicated to Mansur, with the Commentary of Sillanus de Nigris" is a Latin book by Rhazes, from 1483, that is known for its ninth chapter, which is about therapeutics

 
Drug discovery
Health policy
Medicinal chemistry
Pharmaceutical sciences